Faiyaz (Devangari: फ़ैयाज़, Urdu: فیّاض) is an Arabic name which means "judge", "artistic", "aesthetic", "helper" or "leader".

People with the name include:

 Faiyaz Koya, Fijian politician
 Faiyaz Khan (1886–1950), Indian classical vocalist
 Muhammad Faiyaz Ali Khan (1851–1922), Indian administrator and philanthropist

Arabic masculine given names